James Maurice Quinton (12 May 1874 – 22 December 1922) was an English first-class cricketer, a right-handed batsman who bowled right-arm fast.

Cricket career
Quinton made his first-class debut for Oxford University in 1895 against the Marylebone Cricket Club. That same season Quinton made his County Championship debut for Hampshire against  Leicestershire.

In 1896 Quinton played his final first-class match for Oxford University, coming against the 	Marylebone Cricket Club, the team he made his debut against the previous year. Quinton also represented Hampshire in two first-class matches in 1896, against Sussex and Yorkshire.

His final appearance for Hampshire came three years later in 1899 in a County Championship match against Essex.

Family
Quinton's brother, Francis Quinton, also represented Hampshire in first-class cricket. Quinton played alongside Francis in two matches against Sussex and Yorkshire.

Death
Quinton's death was unusual and tragic. He was found shot through the top of his head in the lavatory of a first-class carriage of a train from London at Reading station on 22 December 1922. The inquest was told by his older brother Francis Quinton that James had been depressed after a bout of influenza and had been unreasonably worried over a mistake in his membership of a London club, an apparently trivial matter which he had seen as a potential disgrace for himself and his family. The coroner returned a verdict of "Suicide during temporary insanity". At the time of his death, Quinton was described as living in Church Crookham, Hampshire and as being employed as a schoolmaster at Stanmore Park School, Stanmore, Middlesex, where his headmaster was an Oxford cricket Blue of an earlier vintage, Vernon Royle.

References

External links
James Quinton at Cricinfo
James Quinton at CricketArchive

1874 births
1922 deaths
People from Shimla
English cricketers
Oxford University cricketers
Hampshire cricketers
Cricketers from Himachal Pradesh
Alumni of Worcester College, Oxford
1922 suicides
Suicides by firearm in England
British people in colonial India